The Karmanasa River is a tributary of the Ganges. It originates in Kaimur district of Bihar and flows through the Indian states of Uttar Pradesh and Bihar. Along the boundary between Uttar Pradesh and Bihar it has the districts of Sonbhadra, Chandauli, Varanasi and Ghazipur on its left (UP side); and the districts of Kaimur and Buxar on its right (Bihar side).

Disambiguation
Karmanasa is also the name of a river in the Garhwal Himalayas.

Etymology
The name of the river means "destroyer of religious merit". There are several legends about it.

According to one legend, the sage Vishvamitra through tapasya (penance, meditation and correct practices) acquired the power to create a whole new universe. When he set out to create a new universe it aroused consternation in Indra. However, he continued and after creating a copy of our universe, he started creating people, the first being Trishanku whom he decided to send up to rule his new universe. Indra stopped his progress. That is how Trishanku ended up suspended head down in mid-air. The Karmanasa was born out of the saliva dripping from his mouth.

Course
It flows in a north-westerly direction through the plains of Mirzapur, then forms the boundary between Uttar Pradesh and Bihar, and finally joins the Ganges near Village Bara (East Side) Ghazipur Uttar Pradesh and Chausa (Bihar).

Tributaries
Its tributaries are the Durgavati, the Chandraprabha, the Karunuti, the Nadi, the Goriya and the Khajuri.

Waterfalls
The Karmanasa reaches the plains by a succession of leaps, including three falls known as the Karkatgarh,Devdari and the Chhanpathar, which, from their height and beauty, are 
deserving of special notice. However, Chandauli district administration mentions Devdari Fall as being on the Chandraprabha River.

Dams and bridges
There are two dams across the Karmanasa – the Latif Shah bund and the Nuagarh dam. There also is a dam across the Chandraprabha.

The Grand Trunk Road passes over a bridge on the Karmanasa.

Archaeology
UP State Archaeology department under the direction of Rakesh Tewari, excavations has unearthed iron artifacts dated between 1200 – 1300 BC at Raja Nal Ka Tila site in Karmanasa river valley of north Sonebhadra. It throws new light on the history of iron-making in India.

History
The Karmanasa was the eastern boundary of Awadh. It also possibly was the western boundary of the Sena dynasty.

At the Battle of Chausa, situated on the banks of the Karmanasa, on 26 June 1539, Sher Shah defeated the Mughal emperor Humayun and assumed the royal title of Farīd al-Dīn Shēr Shah.

See also
Besu River
Gangi River
Eknaiya River
Kodra River
Suar River
Karmanasa Canal

References

External links
 

Rivers of Bihar
Rivers of Uttar Pradesh
Ghazipur district
Rivers of India
Sonbhadra district